Ministry of Radhosps of the Ukrainian SSR was a government ministry in charge of sovkhozes (state farms) in Ukraine that existed in 1947 to 1957. In 1957 merged with the existing Ministry of Agriculture.

List of Ministers
 Nikifor Kalchenko 1947-1950
 Poplyovkin ~1970

Further reading
 Vidomosti Verkhovnoyi Rady URSR #4 (Herald of the Supreme Council of Ukraine), 31 May 1957.

External links
 Declaration of the Council of Ministers on August 14, 1970

Radhosp
Radhosp
Ukraine, Radhosp